James Hall (August 19, 1793 - July 5, 1868) was a United States judge and man of letters.  He has been called a literary pioneer of the Midwestern United States.

Biography
Hall was born at Philadelphia. After studying law for some time, in 1812 he joined the United States Army. In the war with Great Britain, he distinguished himself in engagements at Lundy’s Lane and Fort Erie. At the end of the war, he accompanied an expedition against Algiers, but in 1818 he resigned his commission, and continued the study of law at Pittsburgh, Pennsylvania.

In 1820, Hall moved to Shawneetown, Illinois, where he commenced practice at the bar and also edited the Illinois Gazette. Soon after he was appointed public prosecutor of the circuit, and in 1824 state circuit judge. In 1827 he became state treasurer, and held that office till 1831, but he continued at the same time his legal practice and also edited the Illinois Intelligencer. Subsequently, he became editor of the Western Souvenir, an annual publication, and of the Illinois Monthly Magazine, afterwards the Western Monthly Magazine. As a fiction writer, his most famous story is “The Indian Hater” (1828). He died in Loveland, Ohio.

Works
The following are his principal works:—
 Letters from the West, originally contributed to The Port Folio, and collected and published in London in 1828
 Legends of the West (1832)
 The Soldier’s Bride and other Tales (1832)
 The Harpe’s Head, a Legend of Kentucky (1833)
 Sketches of the West (2 vols., 1835)
 Tales of the Border (1835)
 Notes on the Western States (1838)
 History of the Indian Tribes of North America, in conjunction with Thomas L. McKenney (3 vols., 1838-1844)
 The Wilderness and the War-Path (1845)
 Romance of Western History (1857)

References

1793 births
1868 deaths
American magazine editors
Illinois lawyers
People from Loveland, Ohio
19th-century American male writers
People from Shawneetown, Illinois
Illinois state court judges
State treasurers of Illinois
Military personnel from Philadelphia
American lawyers admitted to the practice of law by reading law
19th-century American lawyers
Historians of Native Americans
19th-century American judges